The 1898 Cincinnati Reds season was a season in American baseball. The team finished in third place in the National League with a record of 92–60, 11.5 games behind the Boston Beaneaters.

Regular season 
The Cincinnati Reds came into the 1898 season with high hopes, and hoping not to have a late season collapse, which had happened the previous three seasons.

The club retained manager Buck Ewing for a fourth season, and made a few player changes in the off-season.  Cincinnati was involved in a seven player trade with the Pittsburgh Pirates, as the Reds sent Bill Gray, Jack McCarthy, Billy Rhines, Pop Schriver and Ace Stewart to the Pirates for Pink Hawley, Mike Smith and $1,500.  Hawley had a record of 18–18 with Pittsburgh in 1897, posting an ERA of 4.80.  His best season was in 1895 with the Pirates, as he was 31–22 with a 3.18 ERA in a National League high 56 games pitched.  Smith batted .310 with six home runs and 54 RBI with the Pirates in 1897.  He also previously played for the Reds when they were members of the American Association, as he saw limited playing time in Cincinnati from 1886–1889.  The Reds also acquired Algie McBride, who spent the 1897 season with the St. Paul Saints of the Western League, hitting .381 there.  McBride had previous major league experience, appearing in nine games with the Chicago Colts in 1896.

Jake Beckley led the offense, as he hit a solid .294 with a team high four home runs, while earning 72 RBI. Tommy Corcoran led the club with 87 RBI, while Mike Smith hit a team best .342, as well as hitting one home run and driving in 66 runners.

On the mound, Hawley was very solid, going 27–11 with a 3.37 ERA in 43 games pitched.  Ted Breitenstein cracked the 20 win plateau, as he was 20–14 with a 3.42 ERA.  Frank Dwyer and Bill Dammann each went 16–10.

Season summary 
The Reds got off to a great start, as they posted a record of 18–4 in their first twenty-two games, three games ahead of the second place Cleveland Spiders.  Cincinnati remained hot, as their record improved to 27–7, and took a four-game lead over the Spiders, however, a 7–12 slump in their next nineteen games saw their lead dwindle down to one game over the second place Boston Beaneaters.

The Reds held on to first place, as they got hot once again, and took a five-game lead over the Beaneaters with a 65–32 record during the first week of August.  The team then fell into a 2–8 slump over their next ten games and found themselves in second place, 3.5 games behind Boston.  Cincinnati regained first place, and hung on to it going into the start of September, with a 78–44 record, but a 2–9 mark during their next eleven games saw the Reds fall out of first place for good, as they fell into third, 6.5 games behind the Beaneaters.  Cincinnati finished out the season in third place with a 92–60 record, 11.5 games behind Boston.

Season standings

Record vs. opponents

Roster

Player stats

Batting

Starters by position 
Note: Pos = Position; G = Games played; AB = At bats; H = Hits; Avg. = Batting average; HR = Home runs; RBI = Runs batted in

Other batters 
Note: G = Games played; AB = At bats; H = Hits; Avg. = Batting average; HR = Home runs; RBI = Runs batted in

Pitching

Starting pitchers 
Note: G = Games pitched; IP = Innings pitched; W = Wins; L = Losses; ERA = Earned run average; SO = Strikeouts

Other pitchers 
Note: G = Games pitched; IP = Innings pitched; W = Wins; L = Losses; ERA = Earned run average; SO = Strikeouts

Relief pitchers 
Note: G = Games pitched; W = Wins; L = Losses; SV = Saves; ERA = Earned run average; SO = Strikeouts

References

External links
1898 Cincinnati Reds season at Baseball Reference

Cincinnati Reds seasons
Cincinnati Reds season
Cincinnati Reds